Mark Siegler (born June 20, 1941) is an American physician who specializes in internal medicine. He is the Lindy Bergman Distinguished Service Professor of Medicine and Surgery at the University of Chicago. , He is the Founding Director of Chicago's MacLean Center for Clinical Medical Ethics. Siegler has practiced and taught internal medicine at the University of Chicago for more than 50 years.

In 2011, the Matthew and Carolyn Bucksbaum Family Foundation presented an endowment of $42 million to the University of Chicago to create the Bucksbaum Institute for Clinical Excellence. Siegler was appointed the Executive Director of the Institute.

Siegler has published more than 215 journal articles, 65 book chapters and five books. His textbook, co-authored with Al Jonsen and William Winslade, Clinical Ethics: A Practical Approach to Ethical Decisions in Clinical Medicine, 8th Edition (2015), has been translated into eight languages and is widely used by physicians and health professionals around the world. His most recent book, co-edited with Laura Roberts, MD, is Clinical Medical Ethics: Landmark Works of Mark Siegler, MD.

Clinical Medical Ethics

He has developed a field called Clinical Medical Ethics whose main goal is to improve the
quality of patient care by identifying, analyzing, and contributing to the resolution of ethical problems that arise in the routine practice of clinical medicine. He also supervised the initiation of Consultations in Clinical Ethics as a hospital service and developed the oldest and largest Clinical Medical Ethics fellowship in the world.

Selected awards and honors
2010 - Lifetime Achievement Award from the American Society of Bioethics and Humanities (ASBH)
2013 - MacLean Center received the Cornerstone Award from the American Society of Bioethics and Humanities
2015 - Elected a Master of the American College of Physicians (MACP)

Selected books 

 Jonsen AR, Siegler M, Winslade WJ.  Clinical Ethics:  A Practical Approach to Ethical Decisions in Clinical Medicine.  8th Edition.  New York: McGraw-Hill, Inc., 2015.
 Roberts L, Siegler M, eds. Clinical Medical Ethics: Landmark Works and the Legacy of Mark Siegler, MD. New York: Springer, 2017.

References

External links
University of Chicago bio

1941 births
Physicians from Illinois
Living people
Medical ethicists
Princeton University alumni
Pritzker School of Medicine alumni